Rock Creek is a stream in Fremont County, Iowa and Atchison County, Missouri in the United States. It is a tributary of the Missouri River.

Rock Creek was named for the rocky character of its creek bed.

See also
List of rivers of Iowa
List of rivers of Missouri

References

Rivers of Fremont County, Iowa
Rivers of Atchison County, Missouri
Rivers of Iowa
Rivers of Missouri